Hoppea dichotoma is a plant species in the genus Hoppea.

Diffutin is a flavan, a type of flavonoid, found in H. dichotoma.

References

External links

Gentianaceae